Yuzbashi Chay (also Romanized as Yūzbāshī Chāy and Yūzbāsh Chāy) is a village in Kuhgir Rural District, Tarom Sofla District, Qazvin County, Qazvin Province, Iran. At the 2006 census, its population was 523, in 120 families.

References 

Populated places in Qazvin County